''Clavus basipunctatus' is a species of sea snail, a marine gastropod mollusk in the family Drilliidae.

Description
The length of an adult shell varies between 7.4 mm and 12.5 mm. The whorls are not shouldered. The axial ribs do not undulate on base. The spiral threads are microscopic or absent, except on the rostrum. The terminal varix is strong. The subsutural region is not contrastingly dark. The base of the body whorl shows a row of weak white pustules.

Distribution
This marine species occurs off in the Indian Ocean off Mozambique

References

External links

basipunctatus
Gastropods described in 1991